La Trinidad is a town and a municipality in the Estelí department of Nicaragua.

References 

Municipalities of the Estelí Department